The 5th Division was a unit of the Reichswehr.

Creation 
In the Order of 31 July 1920 for the Reduction of the Army (to comply with the upper limits on the size of the military contained in the Treaty of Versailles), it was determined that in every Wehrkreis (military district) a division would be established by 1 October 1920. The 5th Division was formed with the Reichswehr-Brigaden 11 in Kassel and 13 in Stuttgart, both of the former Übergangsheer (Transition Army).

It consisted of 3 infantry regiments: the 13th (Württembergisches) Infantry Regiment, the 14th (Badisches) Infantry Regiment, and the 15th Infantry Regiment. It also included an artillery regiment, an engineering battalion, a signals battalion, a transportation battalion and a medical battalion. It was subordinated to Gruppenkommando 2.

The commander of the Wehrkreis V was simultaneously the commander of the 5th Division. 
For the leadership of the troops, an Infanterieführer and an Artillerieführer were appointed, both subordinated to the commander of the Division. 

The Divisional commanders were:

General of the Infantry Walther Reinhardt (1 October 1920 - 1 January 1925)
General of the Infantry Ernst Hasse (1 January 1925 - 1 February 1927)
General of the Infantry Hermann Reinicke (1 February 1927 - 30 September 1929)
General of the Infantry Hans Freiherr Seutter von Lötzen (1 October 1929 - 1 December 1931)
Generalleutnant Curt Liebmann (1 December 1931 - 1 August 1934)

Notable Infantrieführer : 
 Generalmajor Hermann Geyer (1 October 1931 - 30 September 1932).

Notable Artillerieführers : 
 Oberst Wilhelm Ritter von Leeb (1 March 1928 - 31 January 1929)
 Generalmajor Leonhard Kaupisch (1 February 1930 - 30 September 1932)

In the course of the expansion of the army in 1934, the divisional staff was transferred and renamed to the "Generalkommando" of the V. Armee-Korps.

Garrisons 
The divisional headquarters was in Stuttgart. The subordinate units were located in Württemberg and Hesse.

References

 Feldgrau.com

Infantry divisions of Germany
Military units and formations established in 1920
Military units and formations disestablished in 1934